"My Oh My" is a song recorded by Danish-Norwegian dance-pop group Aqua. It was released as the second single from their debut album, Aquarium (1997), and was initially released in February 1997 before being reissued following the success of "Barbie Girl", "Doctor Jones" and "Turn Back Time" in August 1998. Like many early Aqua tracks, the song featured vocals from both Lene Nystrøm Rasted and Rene Dif. It was the fourth release from the album in the UK, where it peaked at number six, the group's lowest performing single there until "Good Morning Sunshine".

Critical reception
British newspaper Birmingham Evening Mail noted that Aqua "got into swashbuckling mood" in the song's accompanying music video. Can't Stop the Pop deemed it "as brilliantly absurd as ever", complimenting the chorus as "terrifically catchy and – surprisingly for a song where galloping hooves form part of the beat – underpinned with a hint of melancholy." Alex Young of Consequence of Sound gave mixed reception, writing, "The sound of a horse galloping in the beginning really draws one’s inner equestrian out", but Dif’s lyrics were lacking." 

Sarah Davis from Dotmusic declared it as "another cartoon twist on Europop with an addictive chorus". She added that the music video of the song is "memorable". A reviewer from People Magazine complimented "unexpected flourishes", like the classical harpsichord. Also Pop Rescue noted that the sound of "hooves [that] come galloping alongside the sound of a harpsichord" goes on to form the beat of this "dancey fairtale song". They added that "the end result is quite a catchy little dance baroque number."

Music video
The accompanying music video for the single featured the four members of the group on a pirate ship, with Lene being captured by the other members (playing pirates) before turning the tables around and taking over. They then go on to discover treasure. The video was one of five Aqua videos directed by Peder Pedersen. It took over two weeks to build the setting for the video which consisted of a tropical island and a real size pirate ship surrounded by water.

Track listing

 "My Oh My" (Radio edit) – 3:22
 "My Oh My" (Extended version) – 5:03
 "My Oh My" (Disco '70s Mix) – 3:23
 "My Oh My" (Spike, Clyde'n'Eightball Club Mix) – 5:02
 "My Oh My" (H2O Club Mix) – 7:32
 "Original Spinet Theme"* – 0:59
 "My Oh My" – 3:16
* A short instrumental version of the track, from the early development stages of "My Oh My"'s production.

Denmark
"My Oh My" (Radio edit) – 3:22
"My Oh My" (Extended version) – 5:03
"My Oh My" (Disco '70s Mix) – 3:23
"My Oh My" (Spike, Clyde'N'Eightball Club Mix) – 5:02
"My Oh My" (H²O Club Remix) – 7:32
"Original Spinet Theme" – 0:59

UK vinyl
Side A:
"My Oh My" (Spike, Clyde'N'Eightball Club Mix)
"My Oh My" (Extended version)
Side B:
"My Oh My" (H2O Club Remix)
"My Oh My" (Disco '70s Mix)

Australia (1998)
"My Oh My" (Radio edit) – 3:22
"My Oh My" (Extended version) – 5:03
"My Oh My" (Disco '70s Mix) – 3:23
"My Oh My" (Spike, Clyde'N'Eightball Club Mix) – 5:02
"My Oh My" (H2O Club Remix) – 7:32

Italy vinyl (1998)
Side A:
"My Oh My" (Radio) – 3:22
"My Oh My" (Extended) – 5:03
"My Oh My" (Disco '70s) – 3:23
Side B:
"My Oh My" (Spike, Clyde'N'Eightball) – 5:02
"My Oh My" (H2O) – 7:32
"My Oh My" (Original) – 0:59

Charts

Weekly charts

Year-end charts

Certifications

References

Aqua (band) songs
1997 singles
1997 songs
Electronic songs
Eurodance songs
Depictions of Robin Hood in music
Songs written by Claus Norreen
Songs written by Søren Rasted